Cliftondale Park is an unincorporated community and census-designated place in Alleghany County, Virginia, United States. It was first listed as a CDP in the 2020 census with a population of 266.

References

Unincorporated communities in Virginia
Unincorporated communities in Alleghany County, Virginia
Census-designated places in Virginia
Census-designated places in Alleghany County, Virginia